Ingrid Petitjean (born 11 December 1980) is a French yacht racer who competed in the 2004 Summer Olympics and in the 2008 Summer Olympics in the women's 470 event.

References

External links
 
 
 

1980 births
Living people
French female sailors (sport)
Olympic sailors of France
Sailors at the 2004 Summer Olympics – 470
Sailors at the 2008 Summer Olympics – 470
21st-century French women